Heidkopf may refer to:

 Heidkopf (Wiehen Hills), a hill in Minden-Lübbecke district, Germany
 Heidkopf (Spessart), a hill of Bavaria, Germany